Mateusz Kowalczyk and Artem Sitak were the defending champions, but chose not to participate this year.

Rohan Bopanna and  Florin Mergea won the title, defeating Alexander Peya and Bruno Soares in the final 5–7, 6–2, [10–7].

Seeds

Draw

Draw

References

External links
 Main draw

Stuttgart Doubles
Doubles 2015